Critical habitat is a habitat area essential to the conservation of a listed species, though the area need not actually be occupied by the species at the time it is designated. This is a specific term and designation within the U.S. Endangered Species Act-ESA.  Contrary to common belief, designating an area as critical habitat does not preclude that area from development. Rather, a critical habitat designation affects only federal agency actions. Such actions include federally funded activities or activities requiring a federal permit.

Designation process
Critical habitat must be designated for all threatened species and endangered species under the Endangered Species Act, with certain specified exceptions.  Designations of critical habitats must be based on the best scientific information available and in an open public process within specific timeframes. Unless deemed necessary for the species' continued existence, critical habitat do not include the entire geographical area occupied by a species. Department of Defense (DOD) lands are also exempt from being designated as critical habitat. Both public and private land can be specified as critical habitat.

A critical habitat designation does not set up a preserve or refuge; it applies only when Federal funding, permits, or projects are involved. Under Section 7 of the ESA, all Federal agencies must ensure that any actions they authorize, fund, or carry out are not likely to jeopardize the continued existence of a listed species, or destroy or adversely modify its designated critical habitat.

Considerations
Before designating critical habitat, careful consideration must be given to the economic impacts, impacts on national security, and other relevant impacts of specifying any particular area as critical habitat.  An area may be excluded from critical habitat if the benefits of exclusion outweigh the benefits of designation, unless excluding the area will result in the extinction of the species concerned.

Critical habitat requirements do not apply to citizens engaged in activities on private land that do not involve a Federal agency. However, if an activity on property property requires an action by a Federal agency (such as a loan, increasing irrigation flows, permits from a federal agency, etc.), then the Federal agency must ensure that the action will not adversely modify the designated critical habitat.

See also
Habitat Conservation Plan
Habitat conservation
Habitat corridor
Habitat destruction
Habitat fragmentation
Restoration ecology

References

Footnotes 

Habitats
Habitat
Endangered species
Environmental law
Environmental terminology